Rigotto is an Italian surname. Notable people with the surname include:

Elia Rigotto (born 1982), Italian cyclist
Germano Rigotto (born 1949), Brazilian politician

See also
Ridotto
Rigotti

Italian-language surnames